Moscow City Duma District 17 is one of 45 constituencies in Moscow City Duma. The constituency has covered parts of Eastern Moscow since 2014. From 1993-2005 District 17 was based in South-Eastern Moscow; however, after the number of constituencies was reduced to 15 in 2005, the constituency was eliminated. The constituency was recreated in 2009, and for 5 years it covered parts of Northern and North-Western Moscow

Members elected

Election results

2001

|-
! colspan=2 style="background-color:#E9E9E9;text-align:left;vertical-align:top;" |Candidate
! style="background-color:#E9E9E9;text-align:left;vertical-align:top;" |Party
! style="background-color:#E9E9E9;text-align:right;" |Votes
! style="background-color:#E9E9E9;text-align:right;" |%
|-
|style="background-color:#1042A5"|
|align=left|Lyudmila Stebenkova (incumbent)
|align=left|Union of Right Forces
|
|73.48%
|-
|style="background-color:black|
|align=left|Andrey Lychakov
|align=left|Anarchists
|
|6.16%
|-
|style="background-color:"|
|align=left|Nina Kuznetsova
|align=left|Independent
|
|3.87%
|-
|style="background-color:#000000"|
|colspan=2 |against all
|
|13.64%
|-
| colspan="5" style="background-color:#E9E9E9;"|
|- style="font-weight:bold"
| colspan="3" style="text-align:left;" | Total
| 
| 100%
|-
| colspan="5" style="background-color:#E9E9E9;"|
|- style="font-weight:bold"
| colspan="4" |Source:
|
|}

2009

|-
! colspan=2 style="background-color:#E9E9E9;text-align:left;vertical-align:top;" |Candidate
! style="background-color:#E9E9E9;text-align:left;vertical-align:top;" |Party
! style="background-color:#E9E9E9;text-align:right;" |Votes
! style="background-color:#E9E9E9;text-align:right;" |%
|-
|style="background-color:"|
|align=left|Valery Skobinov (incumbent)
|align=left|United Russia
|
|54.98%
|-
|style="background-color:"|
|align=left|Galina Khovanskaya
|align=left|A Just Russia
|
|16.63%
|-
|style="background-color:"|
|align=left|Yelena Pavlova
|align=left|Communist Party
|
|14.47%
|-
|style="background-color:"|
|align=left|Vitaly Zolochevsky
|align=left|Liberal Democratic Party
|
|3.55%
|-
|style="background-color:"|
|align=left|Dmitry Yakovlev
|align=left|Independent
|
|3.49%
|-
|style="background-color:"|
|align=left|Aleksandr Komissarov
|align=left|Patriots of Russia
|
|3.22%
|-
| colspan="5" style="background-color:#E9E9E9;"|
|- style="font-weight:bold"
| colspan="3" style="text-align:left;" | Total
| 
| 100%
|-
| colspan="5" style="background-color:#E9E9E9;"|
|- style="font-weight:bold"
| colspan="4" |Source:
|
|}

2014

|-
! colspan=2 style="background-color:#E9E9E9;text-align:left;vertical-align:top;" |Candidate
! style="background-color:#E9E9E9;text-align:left;vertical-align:top;" |Party
! style="background-color:#E9E9E9;text-align:right;" |Votes
! style="background-color:#E9E9E9;text-align:right;" |%
|-
|style="background-color:"|
|align=left|Aleksandr Smetanov
|align=left|United Russia
|
|54.58%
|-
|style="background-color:"|
|align=left|Mikhail Petrov
|align=left|Communist Party
|
|17.11%
|-
|style="background-color:"|
|align=left|Aleksey Ponomarev
|align=left|Independent
|
|9.45%
|-
|style="background-color:"|
|align=left|Nikolay Pinyasov
|align=left|Yabloko
|
|6.66%
|-
|style="background-color:"|
|align=left|Andrey Andreyev
|align=left|Liberal Democratic Party
|
|4.89%
|-
|style="background-color:"|
|align=left|Igor Brumel
|align=left|A Just Russia
|
|3.63%
|-
| colspan="5" style="background-color:#E9E9E9;"|
|- style="font-weight:bold"
| colspan="3" style="text-align:left;" | Total
| 
| 100%
|-
| colspan="5" style="background-color:#E9E9E9;"|
|- style="font-weight:bold"
| colspan="4" |Source:
|
|}

2019

|-
! colspan=2 style="background-color:#E9E9E9;text-align:left;vertical-align:top;" |Candidate
! style="background-color:#E9E9E9;text-align:left;vertical-align:top;" |Party
! style="background-color:#E9E9E9;text-align:right;" |Votes
! style="background-color:#E9E9E9;text-align:right;" |%
|-
|style="background-color:"|
|align=left|Viktor Maksimov
|align=left|Communist Party
|
|45.87%
|-
|style="background-color:"|
|align=left|Anastasia Tatulova
|align=left|Independent
|
|28.25%
|-
|style="background-color:"|
|align=left|Andrey Medvedkov
|align=left|A Just Russia
|
|12.16%
|-
|style="background-color:"|
|align=left|Ilya Khovanets
|align=left|Liberal Democratic Party
|
|8.98%
|-
| colspan="5" style="background-color:#E9E9E9;"|
|- style="font-weight:bold"
| colspan="3" style="text-align:left;" | Total
| 
| 100%
|-
| colspan="5" style="background-color:#E9E9E9;"|
|- style="font-weight:bold"
| colspan="4" |Source:
|
|}

Notes

References

Moscow City Duma districts